A platoon is a military unit of the United States Army.  It is generally the smallest unit to be commanded by a commissioned officer, known as the platoon leader, currently a first or second lieutenant.  The senior-most non-commissioned officer assists the platoon leader as platoon sergeant, currently a sergeant first class.

The exact size and composition of platoons in the US Army depends on the time period and their intended mission.  Among the combat arms a platoon will consist of several squads or a similar number of armored fighting vehicles, while combat service support platoons are organized based on their function.  Several platoons will be combined into a company, with each platoon receiving a letter designation for identification.

History
In the American Civil War, drill manuals used to train both sides described how a company could be divided into two platoons, which could be further subdivided into two sections of two squads. However very few references are made regarding the use of platoons in combat.  One exception was when a company was deployed as skirmishers: one platoon formed a skirmish line while the other took up position 150 paces behind as support.

When new drill manuals were published in 1891, they retained the organization of a company divided into two platoons commanded by lieutenants.  There was now though greater emphasis on the use of platoons and squads advancing and providing fire support for each other. During the Spanish–American War an infantry company making a frontal assault would advance in rushes: one platoon running forward about fifty yards before going prone, whereupon the other platoon would rise up and rush past it, until close enough to assault the enemy's positions.

World War II

Infantry platoons
The doctrinal role of American infantry during World War II was to seize and hold territory. This was primarily done as part of an overall doctrine of combined arms, but the infantry was capable of acting on their own to accomplish their mission. When facing against another combined force or organized defensive position, however, infantry acting independently was at a disadvantage.

The rifle platoon was the principal subunit of a rifle company with three per company; in turn each platoon was composed of three rifle squads. This mirrored the "triangular" format of larger units, allowing for two subunits to engage in combat while the third remained in reserve as support.
When marching, a rifle platoon would be deployed as the vanguard or rearguard for its parent company, or deployed as an outpost when the march came to a halt. Individual squads would be sent out to scout ahead, patrol the surrounding area or stand guard as sentinels.
On the defensive, a rifle platoon placed on the front line could occupy an area 250–500 yards in length and no more than 200 yards in depth, depending on the terrain.  Individual squads were placed so as to cover a given sector of the defensive line and provide supporting fire for adjacent platoons. The support platoon was situated behind the front line platoons so as to provide supporting fire, protect the flanks and rear, and if necessary counterattack in case of enemy penetration.
When attacking, the rifle platoon's squads would conduct a frontal assault using fire and movement to close with and overrun the enemy's position. While a large flanking maneuver was rarely possible, depending on the terrain and other factors using one or two squads to assault the enemy while the third maneuvered to attack their flank could also be carried out. Likewise the support platoon would provide supporting fire to the attacking platoons, moving up to replace one of them or help secure the objective if necessary, or repel an enemy counterattack.
Within the platoon's headquarters, the platoon guide was responsible for preserving platoon cohesion and maintaining proper cover, concealment, and discipline among the soldiers; of the two messengers one remained with the platoon while the other was assigned to the company commander. Additionally, one of the platoon's riflemen would be designated its sharpshooter and armed with a M1903A4 Springfield (replaced with a M1C rifle starting Jan 1945) Lastly, the rifle platoon had a combat medic assigned to it from the parent battalion's medical detachment.

The weapons platoon provided the rifle company with heavy weapon support which was still mobile enough to maneuver along with the rest of the company. The platoon was normally under company command and its constituent parts rarely attached to rifle platoons as it placed additional burden on the platoon commanders. In instances where it was necessary to provide additional firepower to a rifle platoon, a mortar squad could be attached to a rifle platoon, particular for hitting targets that could not be hit by direct fire. Attaching a light machine gun squad to a rifle platoon was only done in exceptional circumstances.

References 

Military units and formations of the United States Army